The Relief of the Poor Act 1696 (8 & 9 Will. 3, c. 30), formally titled An Act for supplying some Defects in the Laws for the Relief of the Poor of this Kingdom, was a 1697 welfare statute, operating within the framework of the Act for the Relief of the Poor 1601, also called the Elizabethan Poor Act. This Act is perhaps best remembered for its expansion of the requirement that welfare recipients be marked to indicate their status, in this case by wearing a prominent badge.

Badging the poor
This Act required that all welfare recipients, including the wife and children of the head of a household receiving welfare, wear badges prominently on their right shoulders. These badges would contain the first letter of their parish name, followed by the letter "P". Thus, a recipient from Ampthill parish would wear a badge reading "AP". In her Curious Punishments of Bygone Days, Alice Morse Earle noted that this practice was also seen in Colonial America, though the badge format might be different. For instance, a badge for a New York pauper would read "N.Y.", while in Virginia, the badge might contain the parish name rather than an abbreviation, and in other cases might simply read "P.P." for "public pauper". A similar law also existed in Pennsylvania.

This badging practice was distinct from the earlier practice of issuing beggars' badges, which predated the Elizabethan Poor Act. One Act which authorized this was the 1555 Poor Act, 2 & 3 Ph. & M., c. 5.

An earlier statute, 3 Will. & Mar., c. 11, required the overseers of the poor to record the names of all those receiving welfare in their parishes. This statute was intended to limit abuse of funds by overseers. The 1697 Act added the badging requirement for the same reason. The penalty to paupers who did not wear badges was whipping and imprisonment, and overseers providing relief to such paupers were to be fined 20 shillings. One change to the badge requirement came with the Relief of the Poor Act 1782 (also called Gilbert's Act), which allowed "paupers of good character" to leave off the badge. Badging continued to be practiced until 1810, when it was repealed by 50 Geo. 3, c. 52, though by the end of the 18th century it was noted as "almost universally neglected".

The badge continued to be thought of as a means of checking what is now called a welfare trap or poverty trap, wherein people prefer receiving benefits than working. One report ordered by the House of Commons of England suggested that temporarily restoring the badge would serve to dissuade such individuals from seeking out relief. The report further argued that "the Poor ought to know and feel that the eye of the public is upon them ready to check fraud and restrain importunity", and that the badge was one such means. Charles Jerram, an evangelical priest of the Church of England, did not go so far as to call for the revival of the badge, but did call for some means by which to distinguish "the profligate pauper from the unfortunate and virtuous sufferer".

Joseph Townsend, on the other hand, harshly criticized the badging practice as applying a badge of shame on the poor in exchange for relief. He further noted that many overseers disregarded the badge requirement, risking the fine. Townsend also argued that the badge had no real effect on those who it was truly seeking to dissuade from seeking out relief, for they would have no qualms about wearing the badge, while the more modest poor "would sooner die than wear it".

Year's service rule
Part of the system involved the determination of what parish to which a recipient belonged, and was thereby responsible to provide relief to that recipient. Under the earlier Poor Relief Act 1662, also known as the Settlement Act, a parish could banish those poor unable to rent lodgings of at least £10 per year within forty days of their arrival in the parish. Those banished this way would be sent back to their parish of birth, or where they had resided in the prior three years.

The 1697 Act provided that a worker remaining "in the same service" for one year was given the right to settle in the parish, and thereafter would not be subject to expulsion when beginning to draw relief. The specifics required to gain settlement under this provision were explored in a number of cases. For instance, in R v Ulverstone, a woman servant was discharged from her contract to serve from Whitsuntide one year until the next year—a period of greater than 365 days that year—before its end, but after 365 days had elapsed. The Court held that despite being discharged before the end of the contract, she had served for one full year and was entitled to settle in the parish.

Another aspect of this rule is how "same service" is determined. It was possible for the circumstances, such as the contract of hiring, the master, or even the location to change to some degree without resetting the one year requirement. For example, in R v Overton, a servant was engaged from March until Michaelmas, and then hired for a full year. Said servant left in April—less than one year into the contract, but more than one year since he was first engaged. The court held that the two periods of service could be connected, and the servant was entitled settlement rights under the Poor Law.

See also

 Poor relief
 Poverty in the United Kingdom
 Poor Law Amendment Act 1834
 Badge of shame

Notes

References

Further reading

Statutes

Texts and treatises
  
  

English Poor Laws
1697 in England
1697 in law
Acts of the Parliament of England